Toshio Niimi (born 14 June 1949) is a Japanese former handball player who competed in the 1972 Summer Olympics.

References

1949 births
Living people
Japanese male handball players
Olympic handball players of Japan
Handball players at the 1972 Summer Olympics